Adama Jammeh (born 26 August 2000) is a Gambian professional footballer who plays as a forward for the club Étoile du Sahel.

Professional career
On 7 September 2018, Jammeh signed a professional contract with Étoile du Sahel. He made his professional debut with Étoile du Sahel in a 4-1 Tunisian Ligue Professionnelle 1 win over Stade Tunisien on 9 January 2019.

International career
Jammeh made his professional debut with the Gambia national football team in a 0-0 2018 African Nations Championship qualifying tie on 15 July 2017.

References

External links
 
 

2000 births
Living people
People from Serekunda
Gambian footballers
The Gambia international footballers
Étoile Sportive du Sahel players
Tunisian Ligue Professionnelle 1 players
Association football forwards
Gambian expatriate footballers
Expatriate footballers in Tunisia
The Gambia youth international footballers